This List of Italian PDO/DOP cheeses includes all the Italian cheeses which have Protected Designation of Origin (or DOP/PDO), status under European Union regulations. All of the formerly existing "DO" cheeses (protected under Italian law) were registered in the EU as "PDO/DOP" cheeses during the course of 1996. They have the Italian abbreviation for PDO (DOP) written on the cheese.

Prior to 1996 when the PDO system came into operation, many Italian cheeses were regulated under a denominazione di origine (DO) system, which arose out of the 1951 Stresa Conference and was established under the Italian law 125/54. These appellations of origin were recognized in a number of European countries with which Italy had bilateral agreements. The international framework of recognition was further developed, and extended from cheese to include other agricultural products, by the Lisbon Agreement for the Protection of Appellations of Origin and their International Registration, and the modifications made to it at Stockholm in 1967. Italian cheeses protected under this agreement remain protected. Geographical indications are also protected through the TRIPS agreement of 1994.

Italian PDO/DOP cheeses

The following table indicates for each cheese the year in which it acquired DO status (where applicable), the year of PDO/DOP registration and the approximate area within which the regulations permit it to be produced.

Key to acronyms
 DO: Denominazione di Origine (Appellation of Origin)
 DOP: Denominazione di Origine Protetta (PDO, or Protected Designation of Origin)
 DPR: Decreto del Presidente della Repubblica (Presidential Decree)
 DPCM: Decreto del Presidente del Consiglio (Prime-ministerial Decree)
 PDO: Protected Designation of Origin

Applications under consideration
Applications have been made for DOP status in the case of the following cheeses:
Nostrano di Valle Trompia, a cows' milk cheese, coloured with saffron, produced in the Valle Trompia region of the Province of Brescia (Lombardy) The application was submitted on 22 September 2010.
Pecorino di Picinisco, a sheep's milk cheese (with the optional inclusion of up to 25% goats' milk), produced in the Valle di Comino region of the Province of Frosinone (Lazio).  The application was submitted on 28 February 2011.
 Squacquerone di Romagna, a cows' milk cheese from the region of Emilia-Romagna in the provinces of Ravenna, Forlì-Cesena, Rimini and Bologna, and in part of the Province of Ferrara. The application was submitted on 4 December 2009.

See also

 Italian cuisine
List of Italian cheeses

Notes

References
Useful sources for the dates of recognition and copies of the production regulations for many of these cheeses include:
www.formaggio.it, Formaggi Italiani DOP e STG
European Commission DOOR database

Cheeses, List of Italian PDO
Italian PDO
+ItalyList of Italian DOP cheeses